The Eighteen-Carat Kid and Other Stories is a collection of early short stories and a novella by P. G. Wodehouse, first published in the United States on September 1, 1980 by Continuum, New York City, five years after Wodehouse's death.

The collection was edited and introduced by one of Wodehouse's biographers, David A. Jasen. The stories had all previously appeared in magazines, and William Tell Told Again (a retelling of the William Tell legend) was published as an illustrated book in the United Kingdom in 1904.

Contents 
 "The Eighteen-Carat Kid"
 UK: The Captain, January 3, 1913
 "The Wire-Pullers" (starring Joan Romney)
 UK: Strand, July 1905
 US: Strand (US), August 1905
 "The Prize Poem" (A school story, which appeared in the UK collection Tales of St. Austin's)
 UK: Public School Magazine, July 1901
 William Tell Told Again
 "Epilogue"

See also 
 A categorised list of Wodehouse's short stories

External links 
 
 
 
 
 
The Russian Wodehouse Society's page

1980 short story collections
Short story collections by P. G. Wodehouse
Continuum International Publishing Group books
Books published posthumously